Events from the year 1985 in North Korea.

Incumbents
Premier: Kang Song-san 
Supreme Leader: Kim Il-sung

Events

Births

 2 July - Pak Nam-chol
 2 September - Cha Jong-hyok.
 5 September - Pak Chol-jin.

References

 
North Korea
1980s in North Korea
Years of the 20th century in North Korea
North Korea